Brad Blum (born 1953) is the Co-Owner of FoodFirst Global Restaurants. He was the Founder, Chairman & CEO of FoodFirst Global Restaurants, Inc., upon the establishment of the company in May 2018. Previously he was the CEO of Burger King from December 2002 to July 2, 2004. He joined the company from Darden Restaurants where he had headed the Olive Garden unit, but left after only 18 months citing strategic differences with Burger King's board. Blum's successor, Greg Brenneman, was appointed on August 1, 2004. Blum was the CEO of Romano's Macaroni Grill from December 2008 to July 2010.

Education
Blum graduated from Denison University with a BA in Economics and Urban Studies. He continued his formal education by earning an MBA in  marketing and finance from Northwestern's J.L. Kellogg Graduate School of Management.

Career

General Mills

After college, Blum worked with General Mills as a marketing executive. He worked at General Mills on both a national and international level. 

Blum helped to lead a start-up company called "Cereal Partners Worldwide" (CPW) in Switzerland; they had partnered up with Nestlé for an equal interest in the company, 50/50. Cereal Partners Worldwide is a large international company with sales exceeding $2,500,000 per year. Blum is credited with putting the first female athlete on a Wheaties box (Mary Lou Retton), and with putting the first African American athlete on a Wheaties box (Walter Payton). Blum also invented a new cereal for General Mills: Cinnamon Toast Crunch, the company's most profitable brands

Olive Garden

Starting in 1994, Blum left General Mills and joined Olive Garden as its executive vice president of marketing. He was later promoted to  president. For the next eight years he oversaw Olive Garden's growth. Under Blum's leadership as the chief executive, Olive Garden achieved 57 consecutive quarters of same-restaurant sales increases, with continually increasing profits. The company's restaurant branch average increased by 67 percent during Blum's time there. In 2000, he won the MUFSO (Multi-Unit Foodservice Operators) Operator of the Year, a very high honor within the restaurant industry. In early 2002, he left Olive Garden.

Darden Restaurants

In March 2002, Blum moved further up the ladder to become Vice Chairman of Darden Restaurants, the owner of the Olive Garden restaurant chain. Because of his leadership, Olive Garden became Darden's most successful and recognizable company. Blum oversaw Olive Garden and Smokey Bones (considered one of Darden's most promising new restaurant companies). Darden was, and is, considered the largest casual dining restaurant company in the world, and Blum oversaw quality assurance, purchasing, and distribution for all the brand-name restaurants that Darden owned. Purchasing included the very fickle and mercurial business of global fish and seafood supply for  Red Lobster. Blum also evaluated up and coming restaurants for newly prospective acquisitions.

Burger King

Blum was named the CEO of Burger King in late 2002, having been hired to turn the declining company around. He was hired after Diageo sold Burger King Corporation to the private equity group of Texas Pacific Group, Bain Capital, and Goldman Sachs. During his tenure at Burger King, Blum oversaw the company's improvement in its financial performance. In his first year, profits doubled and positive growth was trending; the average restaurant sales increased from a loss of 7% to a growth of 4%. This proved advantageous when the company initiated an IPO in 2006.

Romano's Macaroni Grill

In late 2008, Romano's Macaroni Grill was suffering declines in sales, profits, and market share of the casual dining industry, and hired Blum as its CEO. He oversaw a turnaround in the same-restaurant sales from an annual loss of 11% to a 3% profit. Macaroni Grill's change in fortunes was partially based on a complete revamp the chain's menu, reorienting its cooking style on a more Mediterranean method of preparing and cooking food. In the first fifteen months, the changes to the menu not only improved the quality of the chain's products but also lowered its production costs. The caloric content of the products was reduced by 49% from the previous menu, along with a 59% reduction in fat and a 46% reduction in sodium. Blum's name for the change was called "Quality up, Costs down." As a result of these menu improvements, customer satisfaction rate for the chain grew. In May 2010, Nation's Restaurant News named Blum the Menu Master's Innovator of the Year in the restaurant industry for his accomplishments at Macaroni Grill.

FoodFirst Global Restaurants
Blum and Brazilian-based investment firm GP Investments, Ltd. formed FoodFirst Global Restaurants, Inc. and acquired its first brands, Brio Tuscan Grille™ (Brio) and Bravo Cucina Italiana™ (Bravo) on May 24, 2018. In early 2020, Blum resigned as Chairman and CEO but remains a Co-Owner of the company.

Personal life 
Blum's hometown is Cincinnati, Ohio. His hobby is auto racing.

References

1953 births
Living people
Burger King people
Denison University alumni
Kellogg School of Management alumni
24 Hours of Daytona drivers